Altındağ Theatre is a theatre in Altındağ district of  Ankara, Turkey. It is operated by the Turkish State Theatres.

References

Theatres in Ankara
Altındağ, Ankara
Turkish State Theatres